The Coffee Board of India is an organisation managed by the Ministry of Commerce and Industry of the government of India to promote coffee production in India.

The head office of the Coffee Board is situated in Bangalore.

History
The Coffee Board of India was established by an act of Parliament in 1942.  Until 1995 the Coffee Board marketed the coffee of a pooled supply. Later, coffee marketing became a private-sector activity due to the economic liberalisation in India.

The Coffee Board's traditional duties included

 promotion of sale, consumption of coffee in India and abroad
 conducting coffee research
 financial assistance to establish small coffee growers
 safeguarding working conditions for laborers
 managing the surplus pool of unsold coffee.

References

 "Coffee Board of India - About Us". www.premiumsmsrefunds.com. 2011. Retrieved 22 October 2011.
John, K.C.; Kevin, S. (2004). Traditional Exports of India: Performance and Prospects. Delhi, India: New Century Publications. p. 117. .

External links

1942 establishments in India
Government agencies established in 1942
Coffee in India
Trade associations based in India
Agricultural organisations based in India
Government agencies of India
Ministry of Commerce and Industry (India)